WJOD (103.3 FM) is a radio station broadcasting a country music format serving the community of Dubuque, Iowa, United States. The station is owned by Townsquare Media and licensed to Townsquare License, LLC.

The station was originally based in Galena, Illinois, and broadcast on a frequency of 107.5. Initially playing adult contemporary, the station later switched to a country music format. The station was later purchased by Cumulus Media and moved to 103.3.

On August 30, 2013, a deal was announced in which Cumulus would swap its stations in Dubuque (including WJOD) and Poughkeepsie, New York to Townsquare Media in exchange for Peak Broadcasting's Fresno, California stations. The deal was part of Cumulus' acquisition of Dial Global; Townsquare, Peak, and Dial Global were all controlled by Oaktree Capital Management. The sale to Townsquare was completed on November 14, 2013.

References

External links
 

µ
Dubuque County, Iowa
Country radio stations in the United States
Townsquare Media radio stations